Way Fong is a frozen dumpling brand. It was the most popular brand among Serious Eats tasters in 2015. 

Way Fong is considered one of the dominant brands and a major player in the frozen dumplings market.

References

External links

Dumplings
Food manufacturers of the United States
Frozen food brands
Companies based in Queens, New York